Roland Dancs (born 19 April 1985) is a Hungarian former football player who played in the Hungarian NB I.

References 
HLSZ – Date Retrieved 13 February 2011

1985 births
Living people
Hungarian footballers
Association football midfielders
Budapest Honvéd FC players
FC Sopron players
Rákospalotai EAC footballers